Jennifer Rudolph Walsh is a board member at the talent agency WME and runs the agency's worldwide literary, speakers, and conference divisions. Walsh's department publishes over 200 books a year, half of those landing on The New York Times Best Seller list.

Biography 
Walsh launched a conference department in 2014, WME Live, which is responsible for creating national conferences for Oprah Winfrey with ‘The Life You Want’ Tour, Arianna Huffington's ‘Thrive', and Cosmopolitan Magazine’s ‘Fun Fearless Life’. She created Together Live in 2016, a touring event emceed by Walsh that brings an array of thought leaders, social activists, athletes, and celebrity guests to cities across the country for a night of inspired talks, interviews, and interactive conversation.

As the sole female member of WME's board after William Morris Agency's merger with Endeavor, Walsh has been named to the Hollywood Reporters Women in Entertainment list for five years running. She created WME's first Women's Summit in 2011, which assembled 120 female execs from the agency's offices around the world.

She joined the William Morris Agency in 2000 when the agency acquired The Writers Shop, of which she was co-owner and co-president.  Walsh founded the New York Public Library Young Lions Fiction Award. Established in 2001, this annual award recognizes the work of young authors.

Walsh serves on the Board of Trustees of Kenyon College, where she received an undergraduate degree and honorary doctor of letters.  She also serves on the board of the National Book Foundation.

References 

William Morris Agency Press Release, May 28, 2003 
Room to Grow
NYPL's Young Lions Award
"Buzz in Books is Caffeine Related", by Josh Getlin. Los Angeles Times, Aug. 14, 2006.
Biography

Literary agents
Living people
Year of birth missing (living people)